

Gustav Hundt (27 September 1894 – MIA 21 April 1945) was a general in the Wehrmacht of Nazi Germany during World War II who commanded several divisions. He was a recipient of the Knight's Cross of the Iron Cross. Hundt disappeared near Troppau, Czechoslovakia on 21 April 1945. He was officially declared dead on 7 June 1950 with the date of presumed death being 21 April 1945.

Awards and decorations

 German Cross in Gold on 15 December 1941 as Oberstleutnant in Artillerie-Regiment 30
 Knight's Cross of the Iron Cross on 15 April 1945 as Generalleutnant and commander of 1. Ski-Jäger-Division

See also
 List of people who disappeared

References

Citations

Bibliography

 
 

1894 births
1945 deaths
German Army personnel of World War I
Lieutenant generals of the German Army (Wehrmacht)
German Army personnel killed in World War II
Military personnel from Bavaria
Missing in action of World War II
People declared dead in absentia
People from Pfaffenhofen (district)
People from the Kingdom of Bavaria
Recipients of the Gold German Cross
Recipients of the Knight's Cross of the Iron Cross